Broken Vows may refer to:

 Broken Vows (1987 film), American television film
 Broken Vows (2016 film), American film 
 A shorten name for I'm Thinking Tonight of My Blue Eyes